Al-Harir Air Base is an Iraqi Air Force and Peshmerga special operations airbase located near to Harir, Erbil Governorate, Kurdistan Region, Iraq.

The base was previously known as Bashur Air Base and was seized during Operation Northern Delay as part of 2003 U.S. invasion of Iraq.

As part of Operation Inherent Resolve the base hosted various American aircraft units such as:
 Pilatus U-28A Draco from the Air Force Special Operations Command
 Boeing MH-47G Chinook from the 160th Special Operations Aviation Regiment (Airborne) (160th SOAR (A))
 Sikorsky MH-60M Black Hawk from the 160th SOAR (A)
 General Atomics MQ-1C Gray Eagle of the United States Army

References

Bases of the United States Air Force
Installations of the United States Army in Iraq
Erbil Governorate